The 1947 Roussillon Grand Prix (formally the II Grand Prix du Roussillon) was a Grand Prix motor race held at Circuit des Platanes de Perpignan on 8 May 1947.

Entry list

Classification
In the first few laps, Georges Grignard, Philippe Étancelin, Jean Achard and Roger Loyer were involved in a four car accident with no injured but the abandon of Achard on his Delage D6 at lap 7.<ref>Motor Sport, XXIII n°6, June 1947, page 155.</ref> At lap 21, Jean-Pierre Wimille, second behind Sommer had engine trouble and retired. After a pole position and with the fastest lap, Raymond Sommer was still leading the race, but 14 laps from the end he retired. Eugène Chaboud won the race on Talbot-Lago T26, ex-Chiron 4.5l monoposto'' Darracq. Henri Louveau finish second just ahead of Yves Giraud-Cabantous.

Pole position: Raymond Sommer in 1:34.8
Fastest lap: Raymond Sommer in 1:34.2 (96.94 km/h).

References

Roussillon Grand Prix
Roussillon Grand Prix
Roussillon Grand Prix
Roussillon Grand Prix